The second season of the British-American animated television series The Amazing World of Gumball, created by Ben Bocquelet, originally aired on Cartoon Network in the United States, and was produced by Cartoon Network Development Studio Europe. The season debuted on August 7, 2012 and ended on December 3, 2013. This season consists of 40 episodes. The season focuses on the adventures of Gumball Watterson, a blue 12-year-old cat, along with his adopted brother, Darwin, a goldfish. Together, they cause mischief among their family, as well as with the wide array of students at Elmore Junior High.

Development

Plot
The season focuses on the misadventures of Gumball Watterson, a blue 12-year-old cat, along with his adopted brother, Darwin, a goldfish. Together, they cause mischief among their family, as well as with the wide array of students at Elmore Junior High, where they attend middle school. In a behind-the-scenes video documenting the production of this season, creator Ben Bocquelet expanded on the development of some of the characters, and how they are based on interactions from his childhood.

Production
The second season began filming on February 7, 2012 and ended filming on June 4, 2013. Before the series premiered on Cartoon Network, a second season was announced in March 2011, consisting of 40 11-minute episodes.<ref name="Grice 2011">{{cite news | url=http://www.worldscreen.com/articles/display/29030 | title=Turner Greenlights Gumball'''s Second Season | work=World Screen | date=March 17, 2011 | access-date=November 16, 2013 | author=Grice, Morgan | location=London}} </ref> Production for the season started in June of the same year. Executive producer and vice president of Cartoon Network Development Studio Europe, Daniel Lennard stated his enthusiasm in the series as "one of the most exciting animation shows to launch in recent years. Commissioning a second series before the first show has aired shows our absolute commitment and belief in the series and we're hoping audiences the world over will embrace this show as much as we have."

Episodes for the season were written by Bocquelet, Jon Foster, James Lamont, Mic Graves, Chris Garbutt, Jon Brittain, Tom Crowley, Tobi Wilson, Yang Benedi, Guillaume Cassuto, and Antoine Perez, and were storyboarded by Aurelie Charbonnier, Chuck Klein, Sebastian Hary, William Laborie, Adrian Maganza, Ben Marsaud, Akis Dimitrakopoulos, Jean Texier, and Charles Schneck. An episode entitled "The Rex", that was going to reveal Mr. Rex's (Tina Rex's father) full appearance, was written for this season but never produced for fiscal reasons. The episode's script was later (apparently) rewritten for the show's fourth season's episode "The Routine", although some fans recommended Bocquelet make the episode as part of the next season.

The season marks a visual change from the prior season; Bocquelet states that he and his production staff had to adapt the art style from the first season in order for more complex animations to work within the 2D and 3D environments. In a subsequent interview with World Screen, he retrospectively described the workflow of the season which proved just as difficult as the first for him and his team; he jokingly stated that he and his staff "went into the second series thinking that we were seasoned animation warriors. The second series proved to be quite hard."

Reception and release

Ratings
The season premiered with the episode "The Remote". The episode was watched by 1.805 million viewers, marking a decrease from the first-season premiere, which had been viewed by 2.120 million viewers for its premiere. The episode with the highest reported viewers for the season was the medial episode, "The Virus", which was watched by 2.570 million viewers. This season had an average of 1.712 million viewers per episode in the United States, a decrease from the previous season which had an average of 1.998 million viewers. The first episode was broadcast on a Tuesday at 8:30 PM. Episodes 2-19 were broadcast Tuesdays at 7:00 PM. Episodes 20-30 were broadcast Wednesdays at 7:30 PM. Episodes 31-40 were broadcast Tuesdays at 7:30 PM.

Reviews and accolades
Ken Tucker of Entertainment Weekly'' gave the season premiere "The Remote" a favorable review. In his article, he praised the visuals, namely "the sophisticated composition of the characters and the show's mastery of pop fun [appealing] to older viewers as well [as young viewers]."

Episodes

DVD releases

References

2012 American television seasons
2012 British television seasons
2013 American television seasons
2013 British television seasons
2